Sheikh Ibrahim al-Sakran (born 4 April 1976) is a Saudi Arabian Islamic scholar, writer, researcher, lawyer and thinker.

Education
He entered the King Fahd University of Petroleum and Minerals and studied for one year and then left the university and went to the College of Sharia at Imam Muhammad bin Saud Islamic University in Riyadh. After graduation he obtained a master's degree in Sharia politics from the Higher Institute of The Judiciary of Imam Muhammad bin Saud Islamic University, then he went to the United Kingdom and received a master's degree in international trade law at the University of Essex in Colchester.

Arrest
In June 2016, Sheikh al-Sakran was arrested at his home in Riyadh by Saudi officials and sentenced to five years of prison. He was then released in 2020 after four years of prison and was rearrested shortly in 2020 after the release.

References

Living people
1976 births
Saudi Arabian Islamic religious leaders
Saudi Arabian writers
King Fahd University of Petroleum and Minerals alumni
Imam Muhammad ibn Saud Islamic University alumni
Alumni of the University of Essex
Saudi Arabian prisoners and detainees